To See or Not to See is a 1969 Canadian animated short film, directed by Břetislav Pojar for the National Film Board of Canada. 

An exploration of fear, the film centres on a scientist who develops a pair of glasses that allows the wearer to see reality instead of subjective perception, thus making fear less onerous and easier to overcome. The 14-minute, 31-second short was voiced by Severn Darden, with sound and music editing by Maurice Blackburn and was produced for the NFB by Robert Verrall and Wolf Koenig.

Awards
 Berlin International Film Festival, Berlin: Golden Bear for Best Short Film, 1969
 Chicago International Film Festival, Chicago: Certificate of Merit, 1969 
 International Cinematography Congress, Colour Film Week, Barcelona: Diploma of Honour, 1969
22nd Canadian Film Awards, Toronto: Film of the Year, 1970
22nd Canadian Film Awards, Toronto: Best Animated Film, 1970
 International Film Festival in Guadalajara, Guadalajara: Award for Animation, 1971
 American Film and Video Festival, New York: Blue Ribbon, 1971
 SODRE International Festival of Documentary and Experimental Films, Montevideo: First Prize, Experimental, 1971

References

External links

 (requires Adobe Flash) 

1969 films
1969 animated films
1969 short films
1960s animated short films
Best Picture Genie and Canadian Screen Award winners
National Film Board of Canada animated short films
Quebec films
Films produced by Robert Verrall
Films about fear
Films directed by Břetislav Pojar
Best Animated Short Film Genie and Canadian Screen Award winners
1960s Canadian films